The 1935 European Wrestling Championships were held in  the men's Freestyle style  in Brussels 5–8 September 1935; the Greco-Romane style and  in Copenhagen 19–21 April 1935.

Medal table

Medal summary

Men's freestyle

Men's Greco-Roman

References

External links
FILA Database

European Wrestling Championships
Sports competitions in Brussels
Sports competitions in Copenhagen
1935 in European sport
Wrestling in Denmark